Las Salinas is a town in the Barahona province of the Dominican Republic. Originally, Las Salinas was a salt mining town, which is how it got its name, from Spanish salina 'salt mine'.

Culture 
At night, the loud and exciting nightlife can be heard from almost anywhere in the town. Music and dancing are key components to Dominican culture and Las Salinas is no exception. Specifically, Dembow, Bachata, Merengue, and Reggaeton are very popular.

Many people enjoy riding motorcycles and doing tricks on the street. The most popular sports are volleyball, basketball, and baseball.

Cuisine 
Las Salinas has many unique dishes. Many dinners tend to have plantains either in the form of tostones or mangú. Other popular dishes usually have one of the following: avena (chocolate oatmeal), spaghetti, fried eggs, and Dominican salami.

Slang 
Dominican Spanish on its own has many differences when compared to neutral Spanish.

Guevedoces

Las Salinas is notable for having a number of children in the village with a rare 5-alpha-reductase deficiency.  Although having a Y-chromosome and male internal organs, at birth they tend to appear externally female and are raised as girls.  Around puberty, the onset of male hormones causes virilization and their actual sex becomes apparent.  At this point, they switch genders and are raised as boys.  This is a common enough occurrence that it does not cause much concern among the townspeople, who are accustomed to it.
These boys are called "guevedoces" from a combined slang form meaning "eggs (testes) at twelve".

References

Municipalities of the Dominican Republic
Populated places in Barahona Province